Ramses is a Dutch miniseries directed by Michiel van Erp with script written by Marnie Blok. Starring Maarten Heijmans in the role of Ramses Shaffy.

Plot 
A chronicle of legendary Dutch singer Ramses Shaffy's rise to fame, from his early days as a stage actor in late 1950s Amsterdam to his emergence as a national music icon throughout the following two decades.

Cast 
Maarten Heijmans ... Ramses Shaffy
Thomas Cammaert ... Joop Admiraal
Noortje Herlaar ... Liesbeth List
Hanne Arendzen ... Maria
Bert Hana ... Klaas de Wit
Xander van Vledder ... Cees Nooteboom
Jim Deddes ... Herman
Floris Verbeij ... Paul
Daniel Verbaan ... Daan

Awards

References

External links
Ramses at the IMDb

Dutch drama television series
Dutch biographical films
Biographies about musicians
Cultural depictions of pop musicians
Cultural depictions of Dutch men
Television series set in the 1950s
Television series set in the 1960s
Television series set in the 1970s
2014 Dutch television series debuts
2014 Dutch television series endings
2010s Dutch television series
NPO 2 original programming